Fabrice Gautrat (born November 4, 1987) is an American soccer player and coach. Gautrat is currently an assistant coach with North Carolina Courage in the National Women's Soccer League.

Playing career
Gautrat was a member of the San Diego Toreros soccer roster in 2006 and 2007. He later played for The Master's Mustangs from 2009 to 2011.

Gautrat spent four years with UJA Maccabi Paris Métropole, one year with Orange County Blues, and one year with the Atlanta Silverbacks FC. He retired at the end of the 2015 season.

Coaching career
In August 2018, Gautrat was named Head Coach of Chicago FC United’s girls program in the U.S. Soccer Development Academy (USDA). He was promoted to Academy Director in February 2020 and led the program through a transition to the Girls Academy league  after the USDA folded.

In February 2022, Gautrat was named a full-time assistant coach for the Chicago Red Stars. Gautrat previously served as a part-time assistant coach. In January 2023, he was named as an assistant coach for North Carolina Courage.

Personal
Gautrat is married to United States women's national soccer team player Morgan Brian.

References

External links
 USL Pro profile
 2006 San Diego statistics
 2007 San Diego statistics

1987 births
Living people
American soccer players
San Diego Toreros men's soccer players
Southern California Seahorses players
Orange County SC players
Atlanta Silverbacks players
American expatriate soccer players
Soccer players from California
USL League Two players
USL Championship players
North American Soccer League players
Association football defenders
Sportspeople from Santa Clarita, California
Chicago Red Stars non-playing staff
North Carolina Courage non-playing staff
The Master's University alumni